The Star 1466 is a tri-axle (6x6) truck in service with the Polish Armed Forces. Produced by Star Trucks (later MAN Star Trucks & Buses), the truck was designed as a replacement for the Star 266, which was phased out of production in 2000. The truck was produced between 2001 and 2006, after which it was succeeded by the Star 1444.

The truck, first shown in 1999, utilized MAN components, like crew cab and engine. The same year MAN became na owner of Star Trucks. As a result of MAN policy to gather truck construction in Steyr works, in 2006 it was decided to stop truck manufacturing in Starachowice and this put an end to Polish-designed Star 1466.

Polish Army ordered only small quantities of these trucks – 75 were delivered in 2000-2007.

150 were sold to Yemen, as a part of Star 266 contract.

References 

Trucks
Military vehicles introduced in the 2000s
Cab over vehicles